The Cabbie is a 2000 Taiwanese film directed by Chang Huakun and Chen Yi-wen. It was Taiwan's submission to the 74th Academy Awards for the Academy Award for Best Foreign Language Film, but was not accepted as a nominee.

Cast
Rie Miyazawa	
Chung-Heng Chu
Tai Bo
Joyce H. Cheng
Tsai Tsan-te
Chao-Bin Su
Tsung Sheng Tang
Leon Dai
Hsin-Ling Chung
Wei-Ming Wang
Hsin Shao
Chun-hao Tuan
Chuan Wang
I-Chen Ko
Shao-Wen Yang
Chen-Nan Tsai
Yueh-Hsun Tsai
Phoenix Chang
Li-Chun Lee
You-Ning Lee
Feng-Ying Lin

See also

Cinema of Taiwan
List of submissions to the 74th Academy Awards for Best Foreign Language Film

References

External links

2000 films
2000s Mandarin-language films
2000 comedy films
Taiwanese comedy films